Plectrohyla psiloderma is a species of frogs in the family Hylidae. It is found in the mountains of western Honduras and adjacent El Salvador. It is threatened by habitat loss caused primarily by agricultural encroachment and wood extraction. Pesticides are suspected to be a threat. Chytridiomycosis is also a potential threat. It is found in the Celaque National Park in Honduras, and might also occur is some other protected areas.

References

psiloderma
Endangered fauna of North America
Frogs of North America
Amphibians of El Salvador
Amphibians of Guatemala
Amphibians described in 1999
Taxonomy articles created by Polbot